Altunizade is a station on the Istanbul Metrobus Bus rapid transit line. It is located on the Istanbul Inner Beltway, within the Altunizade interchange. The station is serviced by four of the seven Metrobus routes.

Altunizade station was opened on 3 March 2009 as part of the eastward expansion of the line across the Bosporus.

References

External links
Altunizade station
Altunizade in Google Street View

Istanbul Metrobus stations
Üsküdar